Normal (also known as Angels Gone) is a 2009 Czech thriller film directed by Julius Ševčík. It is an adaptation of the playwright Anthony Neilson's 1991 work Normal: The Düsseldorf Ripper, a fictional account of the life of serial killer Peter Kürten, told from the point of view of his defense lawyer.

Cast
 Milan Kňažko as Kürten
 Dagmar Veškrnová as Marie Kürten
 Pavel Gajdoš as Lawyer Dr. Justus Wehner
 Miroslav Táborský as Klein
 Jan Vlasák as Wenge
 Zuzana Kajnarová as Receptionist
 Meto Jovanovski as Judge

Release
The film was released in the Czech Republic on 26 March 2009.

References

External links
  
 
 Normal on Eurochannel
Quiet Earth

2009 films
2000s biographical films
2000s serial killer films
Czech thriller films
Cultural depictions of Peter Kürten
Films set in Germany
Films shot in Germany
Films set in the 1910s
Films set in the 1920s
Films set in the 1930s
2000s thriller films
Czech biographical films
Films set in Düsseldorf
2000s Czech-language films
2000s Czech films
Czech serial killer films